Gratton is a civil parish in the Derbyshire Dales district of Derbyshire, England.  The parish contains five listed buildings that are recorded in the National Heritage List for England.  All the listed buildings are designated at Grade II, the lowest of the three grades, which is applied to "buildings of national importance and special interest".  The parish is almost entirely rural, and all the listed buildings are farmhouses or farm buildings.


Buildings

References

Citations

Sources

 

Lists of listed buildings in Derbyshire